Teresa Pizarro de Angulo (Cartagena, October 15 1913-Ibidem, April 28 2000) was a Colombian businesswoman, recognized for its association with the National Beauty Contest.

Biography

Early Years 
She is the daughter of Edmundo Pizarro and Constancia Pareja. Her parents died when she was still a child, so she had to move in with her grandparents. She had four sisters.

She began working as a farmer when she was young to provide economic support to her family. She was finally the first woman to own a farm in Cartagena. She later became a member of the Cartagena Lions Club, which helped her gain popularity among the city's residents.

Career 
She began her professional career as a real estate agent, she was the first woman in Cartagena de Indias to practice this profession. In 1957 she was elected vice president of the National Beauty Board, the body that supervises the National Beauty Contest. Although she was not appointed president of the board until 1977. She was named president of Miss Colombia during the 1950s. During her tenure, she established charitable funds that helped organizations for children and the elderly, as well as turning the swimsuit contest into a charity event. , allocating the received to the aforementioned organizations.

Pizarro de Angulo bought a house in Cartagena and turned it into the venue for the contest. In 1996 she was named President Emeritus of the National Board of Beauty. However, she handed over the position to her son, Raimundo Angulo, because he had health problems. She maintained an active social life, attending multiple events and making public appearances, but her health continued to deteriorate after she stepped down from the board.

He collaborated with different charitable organizations, promoting projects to improve services in his community, such as the Eye Clinic of the Lions Club, the construction of the Barrio de Las Reinas, and participated in organizations such as the Las Merecedes Foundation (Bogotá), financed with the funds raised. in the National Beauty Contests.

He developed pulmonary fibrosis, a circumstance for which he died on April 28, 2000 at the age of 86.

References

External links
Elcolombiano.com, in Spanish

1913 births
2000 deaths
Colombian women